Ada Pellegrini Grinover (16 April 1933 – 13 July 2017) was a Brazilian lawyer. She was a full professor at the University of Sao Paulo and attorney for the State of Sao Paulo.

Life
Grinover was born in 1933 in Naples. Her father, Domenico Pellegrini Giampietro, was to become an Italian minister in the 1940s. Her father had been involved with the Italian fascists and they left Italy and the family emigrated to Brazil in 1951. She studied law at the University of Sao Paulo graduating in 1958 and with a doctorate in 1970. In 1973 she became a law Professor and in 1980 a full professor.

In 2002 she was involved in setting up a long list of new laws for Brazil. Others involved were Miguel Reale, Maria Helena Diniz and Gofredo da Silva Teles Júnior, she actively participated in the important drafting of the Brazilian Civil Code.

In 2005, "Studies in Tribute to Professor Ada Pellegrini Grinover" was published by professors Flávio Luiz Yarshell and Maurício Zanoide de Moraes.

Grinover died in São Paulo in 13 July 2017.

References

1933 births
2017 deaths
Italian emigrants to Brazil
21st-century Brazilian women writers
21st-century Brazilian writers
Brazilian women lawyers
Academic staff of the University of São Paulo
University of São Paulo alumni
People of Campanian descent